SHZ or shz may refer to:

 Schleswig-Holsteinischer Zeitungsverlag, a newspaper group based in Flensburg, Schleswig-Holstein, Germany
 SHZ, the IATA code for Seshutes Airport, Leribe District, Lesotho
 shz, the ISO 639-3 code for Syenara language, Burkina Faso